Protein dachsous homolog 1, also known as protocadherin-16 (PCDH16) or cadherin-19 (CDH19) or cadherin-25 (CDH25) or fibroblast cadherin-1 (FIB1), is a protein that in humans is encoded by the DCHS1 gene.

Function 

This gene is a member of the cadherin superfamily whose members encode calcium-dependent cell-cell adhesion molecules. The encoded protein has a signal peptide, 27 cadherin repeat domains and a unique cytoplasmic region. This particular cadherin family member is expressed in fibroblasts but not in melanocytes or keratinocytes. The cell-cell adhesion of fibroblasts is thought to be necessary for wound healing.

Clinical significance 

Mutations in this gene have been shown to cause mitral valve prolapse

References

Further reading